Moran Sarkar was a Punjabi Muslim married to Sikh ruler Maharaja Ranjit Singh of Punjab in 1806. She was a nautch girl before she became a queen. Maharaja Ranjit Singh was supposedly punished by flogging by Akali Phula Singh for marrying her. Mai Moran was sent to live in Pathankot district, in 1811.

Life
Mai Moran was born in a Muslim family in Makhan Windi, near Amritsar She later married Maharaja Ranjit Singh, a year after he became the maharaja of Lahore at the age of 21 and was officially given a name as Maharani Sahiba. She was a nautch girl. Maharaja Ranjit Singh used to meet her in the Punjab region of India and Pakistan. She used to dance for him at the Baradari of Maharaja Ranjit Singh halfway between Amritsar and Lahore. The place was since called Pul Kanjri but now its name has been changed to 'Pul Moran'. She later married Maharaja Ranjit Singh, a year after he became the maharaja of Lahore at the age of 21 and was officially given a name as Maharani Sahiba.

She was considered to be very learned in arts and letters. She was known for her philanthropic acts and in bringing Maharaja's attention to many problems.

The Maharaja at Moran's request, built a mosque called as  Masjid-e-Tawaifan, which was renamed in 1998 as Mai Moran Masjid in Lahore. This is located in Lahore's bazaar now called Pappar Mandi near Shah Almi Gate.

Play
Her life story with Maharaja Ranjit Singh was made into a play by Manveen Sandhu and directed by Kewal Dhaliwal.
The same play written by Manveen Sandhu was translated and directed by Rajiv Kumar Sharma principal Spring Dale Senior School, Amritsar during CBSE National Sahodaya Conference held at Amritsar in November 2013. The audience consisted of appx. 1000 school principals, CBSE officials and other delegates. The cast entirely consisted of school teachers. Rajiv Kumar Sharma presented the play Moran Sarkar 

one last time in the same year during Indo-Pak Peace Festival Saanjh 2013 held at Spring Dale Senior School, Amritsar.

See also
 Pul Moran
 Sikh Period in Lahore
 Dance bar
 Nautch
 Tawaif
 Prostitution in colonial India 
 Prostitution in India

External links
 Link to Mai Moran Masjid on Google Maps
 More Pictures of Mai Moran Mosque in WikiCommons

References

Indian queen consorts
Indian courtesans
Women of the Sikh Empire
18th-century Indian women
18th-century Indian people
19th-century Indian women
19th-century Indian people
Indian women philanthropists
Mosques in Lahore
1781 births
1862 deaths
19th-century dancers
19th-century Indian philanthropists
19th-century women philanthropists